was a velodrome in Tokyo, Japan. Tokyo Dome was built on this site.

The Japan national football team used this ground in 1955, 1956, and 1959.

External links

Sports venues completed in 1949
1972 disestablishments in Japan
Defunct sports venues in Japan
Defunct football venues in Japan
Velodromes in Japan
Sports venues in Tokyo
Buildings and structures in Bunkyō
1949 establishments in Japan
Venues of the 1958 Asian Games
Asian Games cycling venues
Asian Games football venues